Caecilia flavopunctata is a species of caecilian in the family Caeciliidae. It is endemic to Venezuela. Its natural habitats are subtropical or tropical moist lowland forests, plantations, rural gardens, and heavily degraded former forest.

References

flavopunctata
Amphibians described in 1963
Taxonomy articles created by Polbot